Juan David Ramírez Bolívar (born 9 January 1997) is a Colombian footballer who currently plays as a goalkeeper for Austin Bold, on loan from Atlético Nacional.

Ramírez was at the Atlético Nacional youth set-up from 2013 until he made his debut for the first team in 2016. He made no more appearances for the first team until going on loan in 2019. However, he has been in goal for the under 20s.

Career statistics

Club

Notes

References

1997 births
Living people
Colombian footballers
Colombian expatriate footballers
Association football goalkeepers
Atlético Nacional footballers
Austin Bold FC players
USL Championship players
Categoría Primera A players
Colombian expatriate sportspeople in the United States
Expatriate soccer players in the United States
Footballers from Medellín